Michelle Ann French (born January 27, 1977) is an American soccer assistant coach for the United States women's national soccer team. She is a former United States women's national soccer team player and received a silver medal as a member of the 2000 U.S. Olympic Team.

Early life
Born in Ft. Lewis, Washington, French was a two-time Parade High School All-America at Kennedy High School in Burien, Washington.

Playing career

Collegiate
French attended the University of Portland from 1995 to 1999 where she was a four-year starter for the University of Portland Pilots Women's Soccer Team.

At Portland, she appeared in three Final Fours and was a first-time All-American.

In 1997 she was a nominee and a finalist in 1998 for the Hermann Award for the National Player of the Year.

Club
French played for the Washington Freedom in the Women's United Soccer Association (WUSA) in 2001. She played with the San Jose CyberRays from 2002 to 2003.

French played in the W-League with the Seattle Sounders Women in 2004, 2006–2009.

International
French was a member of the U-21 National Team from 1994 to 1999. She captained the team at the 1997, 1998 and 1999 Nordic Cup competitions which the U.S. won in 1997 and 1999.

She was called up to the United States women's national soccer team and earned her first cap on May 11, 1997 against England.

Coaching
French holds a USSF National "A" coaching license and has several years coaching experience at the youth, high school, and collegiate levels.  In 2012, it was announced that she had signed a two-year contract as head coach for the Seattle Sounders Women.

In February 2013, Michelle French joined USSF as a coach for United States women's national under-20 soccer team. She worked on all aspects of the United States under-20 women's national team program and also worked with under-18 and under-17 women's national teams. French prepared the under-20 team for the 2014 FIFA U-20 Women's World Cup in Canada and the 2016 FIFA U-20 Women's World Cup in Papua New Guinea, in which the team failed to win a medal. In February 2017, US Soccer reassigned her to be a full-time assistant coach for the senior women's national team. On December 15, 2017, the University of Portland, French's alma mater, announced she had been hired to replace Garret Smith as head coach of their women's soccer program, the Portland Pilots.

Honors
Michelle was awarded a Golden Scarf by the Seattle Sounders FC on June 5, 2010.

See also
 United States women's national soccer team
 Seattle Sounders Women

References

External links 
  CNN Sports Illustrated: 2000 US Women's National Soccer Team
  UCLA Bruins: Michelle French Assistant Coach Profile
   University of Washington Assistant Coach Profile 
 Michelle French not defined by illness

Living people
American women's soccer players
United States women's international soccer players
Footballers at the 2000 Summer Olympics
Olympic silver medalists for the United States in soccer
Portland Pilots women's soccer players
Washington Freedom players
San Jose CyberRays players
1977 births
Soccer players from Washington (state)
Seattle Sounders Women players
Women's association football midfielders
Medalists at the 2000 Summer Olympics
UCLA Bruins women's soccer coaches
Portland Pilots women's soccer coaches
American soccer coaches
Sportspeople from the Seattle metropolitan area
People from Fort Lewis, Washington
Washington Huskies women's soccer coaches
Seattle Sounders FC non-playing staff
Women's United Soccer Association players